East Port Said Industrial Zone is an industrial park with a total area of 1600 ha in Port Fuad, Egypt. The main developer and promoter of the park is East Port Said Development Co;  It is located at the northern end of the Suez Canal Special Economic Zone.

The government provides a number of incentives to investors in the scheme including zero tax and duties on tools, machines and raw materials related to the production of goods for export.

Industry 
The park includes medium and light industries such as:
 Automobile Assembly Parts
 Construction and Building Material
 Home Appliances and Electronics
 Textile and Ready-made Garment
 Agri-Business and Food Processing
 Pharmaceutical
 East Port Said Port
 ICT
 General Industries

References

 
Industrial parks
Industry in Egypt